= Misgomenai =

Misgomenai (Ancient Greek: Μισγομεναί) was a town in ancient Thessaly. It is unlocated.
